Mahmutköy can refer to:

 Mahmutköy, Keşan
 Mahmutköy, Şuhut